Kisko is a former municipality of Finland. It was consolidated with Salo on 1 January 2009.

It is located in the province of Western Finland and is part of the Southwest Finland region. The municipality had a population of 1,869 (2004-12-31) and covered an area of 284.13 km² of which 30.98 km² is water. The population density was 7.38 inhabitants per km².

The municipality was unilingually Finnish.

History 
Kisko was first mentioned in 1347, when it was a part of the parish of Pohja. It became an independent parish somewhere between the 1400s and the 1500s. At that time, the parish of Kisko also included Suomusjärvi, which became a separate parish in 1898.

Kisko was consolidated with Salo in 2009.

References

External links

http://www.kisko.fi/ – Official website 

Former municipalities of Finland
Salo, Finland
Populated places disestablished in 2009
2009 disestablishments in Finland